Karl Kielblock (23 October 1907 – 26 November 1991) was a South African writer.

Biography 

He was born on 23 October 1907 in Beaufort-Wes and studied first at Paarl Boys' High School, then at Paarl Teachers College. In 1928 he was appointed a teacher at the Laerskool Hendrik Louw in Strand where he taught until 1967.

In 1936 his first book, Die Skat van Java, was published. After that, Kielblock wrote various novels, suspense, and youth literature. Kielblock's suspense books consist of a series with the investigator Frans Lindenhof . His youth books also include a series with the character Lafras Cuyper .

In 1939 he married Vera Abel, from whom he had a son and a daughter. He died on 26 November 1991.

Bibliography 
A total of 43 titles were published by Karl Kielblock.
Adriaan Deneys 1947 
Daar het 'n ster verskyn 1984 
Die avonture van kaptein Elias Sonnenschein 1944 
Die erfenis
Die helder stad 1979 
Die lafaard 1968 
Die raaisel in die spieël 1970 
Die skaam man – 1959
Die skat van Java – 1936
Die swaard verteer −1950
Die vete – 1962
Nooi uit die vreemde – 1961
Die verlore skat – 1964
Die vreemdeling – 1938
Die wraak van Jasper le Feuvre
Ek, die moordenaar – 1951
Guillam Woudberg – 1945
Guillam Woudberg keer terug – 1965
Jasper le Feuvre
Lafras Cuyper en die Britse Lokval
Lafras Cuyper en die gravin – 1979
Lafras Cuyper en die Hirondelle
Lafras Cuyper in Frankryk
Lafras Cuyper in Venesië
Lafras Cuyper Kanonier – 1964
Lodewyk Alleman se soektog
Luitenant Lafras Cuyper
Mooier as die blomme – 1961
Moord in Arkadia
Moord op Allesverloren – 1948
Moord op Eendevlei – 1964
Moord op Geitjieskop −1950
Moord op Kroonbaai – 1961
Nooi uit die vreemde – 1961
Onder die stil waters – 1964
Onrus op Rusdal – 1963
Rebel – 1969 
Rivier van drome
Skuil in die skaduwees – 1965
Sonia Clercq – 1960
Soos water op die grond – 1944
Vaandrig Freyn – 1966
Verhale uit Herodotos – 1977

Notes
 "Die skat van Java" is later reissued as "Die verlore skat"
 "Die wraak van Jasper le Feuvre" is a shortened version of "Jasper le Feuvre"
 "Guillam Woudberg keer terug" is a shortened version of "Guillam Woudberg".

Source: Springbokboeke 

South African writers
1907 births
People from Beaufort West
Year of death missing